Western Ferries (Clyde) Ltd (also known as Western Ferries) is a private ferry company with its headquarters in Hunters Quay, Scotland. It currently operates on the Firth of Clyde running a year-round, high-frequency vehicle carrying service between Hunters Quay, near Dunoon, and McInroy's Point, on the outskirts of Gourock in Inverclyde.

History

In the mid 1960s the islands on the west coast of Scotland were served by two kinds of vessel; mail ferries operated by David MacBrayne Ltd and "puffers" –  small bulk cargo vessels capable of landing at simple piers or on the beach to discharge coal, lime etc. MacBrayne's also operated a number of cargo vessels out of Glasgow. None of these vessels was equipped to deal with road transport. Three car ferries operated by MacBrayne's were all side-loading and not suited to carrying the sharply increasing growth in tourist traffic or commercial vehicles.

In 1966 three people engaged in contracting work on the west coast decided to set up the Eileann Sea Service. With the help of an HIDB loan a landing craft type vessel, Isle of Gigha was constructed and started operation in the middle of the seaman's strike. But in November the ship capsized and this put the company in financial difficulty. If anything further were to happen, more money and technical back-up would be needed.

A group of Scottish businessmen having special interest in shipping and haulage matters, many of whom also had local interest in Islay and Jura, subscribed £100,000 capital and Western Ferries was set up.

Islay service
 was ordered from Ferguson Brothers (Port Glasgow) Ltd. of Port Glasgow. She was designed to carry 20 cars or a combination of cars and commercial vehicles. She was launched amid a storm of derision. Trading began on 7 April 1968 between Kennacraig, West Loch Tarbert, and Islay.

The service provided a new roll-on/roll-off facility, operated twice as frequently as the existing boat to Islay, and offered lower rates without the benefit of subsidy. Unlike its competitor, it operated seven days a week, at night if required, and was punctual. It was immediately successful not only in taking the traffic which had formerly used mail or cargo services but also in converting much of the bulk trade which had formerly travelled in "puffers" to using trailers, thus saving on time, handling, breakage, pilferage and port dues. Lower rates led to a general increase in trade so that a larger and faster vessel was required.

 was ordered from Norway. She came into operation in 1969 with three sailings a day. The capital of the company was increased to £250,000. Western Ferries had already formed a very close working relationship with a local haulier. He opened depots near both ferry terminals so that trailers could be moved on and off the vessels quickly without drivers and tractors units having to cross with them. He provided a parcel service as well as bulk service, and with dedication, grass roots expertise and low rates he built a thriving business.

At the beginning of 1969 the Port Askaig (Islay) – Feolin (Jura) service began – a high frequency service across a short stretch of water with a landing craft type vessel (the Isle of Gigha now modified and renamed , capable of carrying the largest commercial vehicle permitted on the road, or six cars). This effectively joined Islay and Jura and increased the traffic to the mainland. Jura was now served by three through sailings a day instead of three per week and both islands could now enjoy things which had hitherto been luxuries, like fresh fruit.

In 1970, the Sound of Islay began the Campbeltown (Kintyre) – Red Bay (Northern Ireland) service and was successful with the initial help of a cement strike in Ireland and a dock strike in England. Attempts to keep up a winter service, primarily with timber, were unsuccessful. However the Sound of Islay, under Captain Alister Meenan, took over the Kennacraig - Port Askaig route offering, for the first time, a reliable and punctual service.

Caledonian MacBrayne positioned a new ferry on the same route in 1974. The new Cal-Mac service was subsidised by the Government leaving Western unable to compete. Western Ferries started to lose traffic to the new ferry, and after receiving an offer from the Mexican Government, sold Sound of Jura in 1976.  They continued to serve Islay until 1981 using Sound of Islay when she too was withdrawn, unable to keep pace with the heavily subsidised CalMac, and was sold to the Government of Newfoundland and Labrador in Canada, where she remains in service to this day.

Clyde service
In June 1973, Western Ferries opened a new route across the Firth of Clyde between McInroy's Point (Gourock) and Hunters Quay using two modified Swedish vessels Sound of Scarba and Sound of Shuna. These had bow and stern ramps, allowing roll-on/roll-off operation. Traffic developed rapidly and in August 1974, the former Isle of Wight ferry,  joined the service as Sound of Sanda. This crossing was much shorter than the parallel Caledonian MacBrayne Public Service route. Although CalMac's vessels were considerably faster, their longer route meant that both operators took around 20 minutes to make the crossing.   The simpler ro-ro service was regular, frequent and ran from 7 am until 10 pm. Their rates matched the recently reduced rates of CalMac. Traffic kept both services very active. In 1985, after the Clyde service was transferred to Western Ferries (Clyde) Ltd, new tonnage was sought and appeared in the spring of 1986 when the company bought another former Sealink ferry, the Freshwater. She entered service as Sound of Seil in 1986. A further vessel, the Sound of Sleat, a former Dutch river ferry (ex de Hoorn) was added two years later. Two further ferries were purchased from Dutch owners, in 1995 and 1996. Both Sound of Scalpay and the second Sound of Sanda replaced older vessels.

In 2001, Ferguson Shipbuilders of Port Glasgow delivered the second Sound of Scarba, the company's first new ferry for the service. The old vessel was sold after a few years of mooring in the Holy Loch. A new Sound of Shuna followed in October 2003.

Between late 2006 and September 2007 facilities at both ports were restructured. The car marshalling areas were enlarging and a second linkspan was installed at both Hunters Quay and McInroys Point.

All four ferries operate during peak periods, providing a 15-minute service. At other times, three crossings per hour are provided whilst evenings and quieter times see a vessel depart every 30 minutes.

In 2013 two brand new vessels were commissioned by Western. These were built by the Cammell Laird Shipyard in Merseyside. Entering the fleet in October of that year as Sound of Soay and Sound of Seil this brought the fleet size to six however this dropped to four on disposal of the two oldest vessels (Scalpay and Sanda).

The company employs 57 staff including six directors of whom 50 live in the Dunoon area.

Arran Service

In early January 2010, the company announced that it was to commence a high frequency, low fare route between Ardrossan and Brodick in direct competition to publicly owned Caledonian MacBrayne. They stated that they were planning to build a new vessel with a carrying capacity of 400 passengers and 70 vehicles and services were expected to begin in 2012.

In September 2011 managing director Gordon Ross announced that the Arran project is still very much alive but will be delayed by the uncertainty as to whether the Arran route will be tendered separately from the main CalMac bundle in 2013.

Community involvement
The company has a high profile in the communities it serves. There is significant investment in employing local workers and in locally sourced goods and services. Funds are made available for the sponsorship of local groups, individuals, sports organisations and charities. Western Ferries sponsors local sporting events including the Cowal Highland Gathering. 

The company provides a call-out service through the night for the Scottish Ambulance Service, for ambulances carrying emergency cases to hospitals in Greenock, Paisley and Glasgow

Fleet

Present fleet
The company runs a fleet of four purpose-built car ferries.

Historic fleet

References

Notes

Bibliography

External links
 

Ferry companies of Scotland
Transport in Argyll and Bute
Companies based in Argyll and Bute
Transport companies established in 1968
1968 establishments in Scotland
Cowal
Firth of Clyde